Tobacco Garden Creek is a tributary of the Missouri River, approximately  30 mi (48 km) long, in northwestern North Dakota in the United States. It rises in the badlands south of the Missouri in McKenzie County, and flows SE, then NNE. It joins the Missouri in Tobacco Garden Bay, an inlet of Lake Sakakawea.

See also
List of North Dakota rivers

Rivers of North Dakota
Tributaries of the Missouri River
Rivers of McKenzie County, North Dakota